Yelizaveta Nikolaevna Kedrova (Russian: Елизавета  Николаевна Кедрова; 9 October 1909 – 16 February 2000), known as Lila Kedrova, was a Russian-born French actress. She won the Academy Award for Best Supporting Actress for Zorba the Greek (1964), and the Tony Award for Best Performance by a Featured Actress in a Musical for the same role in the musical version of the film.

Life and career
Yelizaveta Nikolayevna Kedrova was born in Saint Petersburg, Russia Empire.  Her parents were Russian opera singers. Her father, Nikolay Kedrov Sr. (1871–1940), was a singer and composer, a creator of the first Russian male quartet to perform liturgical chants. Her mother, Sofia Gladkaya (ru: Софья Николаевна Гладкая), was a singer at the Mariinsky Theatre and a teacher at the Conservatoire de Paris. She had two siblings. Her brother, Nikolay Kedrov Jr. (c. 1904–1981), was a Russian singer and composer of liturgical music. Her sister, Irene Kedroff (Irina Nikolayevna Kedrova), was a soprano.

Several years after the October Revolution, in 1922, the family emigrated to Berlin. In 1928, they moved to France, where Kedrova's mother taught at the Conservatoire de Paris, and her father again recreated Quatuor Kedroff. In 1932, Kedrova joined the Moscow Art Theatre touring company. Then her film career began, mostly in French films, until her first English-language film appearance as Madame Hortense in Zorba the Greek (1964). Her performance won her the Oscar for Best Supporting Actress. Kedrova then appeared in Alfred Hitchcock's film Torn Curtain (1966), playing the role of Countess Kuchinska, a Polish noblewoman in East Berlin who is desperate to emigrate to the United States. Kedrova played Fräulein Schneider in the West End stage production of Cabaret in 1968 with Judi Dench and Peter Sallis.

She then played a series of eccentric and crazy women in Hollywood films. In 1983, she reprised her role as Madame Hortense on Broadway in the musical version of Zorba the Greek, winning both a Tony Award for Best Performance by a Featured Actress in a Musical and a Drama Desk Award in the process. In 1989, she played Madame Armfeldt in the London revival of A Little Night Music.

Her second husband was Canadian stage director Richard Howard (1932–2017).

Death
In 2000, Kedrova died at her summer home in Sault Ste. Marie, Ontario, of pneumonia, having suffered a long time with Alzheimer's disease. She was cremated. Her ashes are buried in her family grave in the Russian cemetery in Paris.

Filmography

References

External links
 
 
 

1909 births
2000 deaths
French film actresses
French musical theatre actresses
French stage actresses
French people of Russian descent
Deaths from pneumonia in Ontario
Deaths from Alzheimer's disease
Neurological disease deaths in Ontario
Best Supporting Actress Academy Award winners
Actresses from Saint Petersburg
Tony Award winners
White Russian emigrants to France
20th-century French actresses
Emigrants from the Russian Empire to France
Best Supporting Actress Genie and Canadian Screen Award winners
20th-century Russian women